Goodburn is a surname of English origin. People with that name include:

 Glynis Penny (born 1951), English retired female long-distance runner
 Kelly Goodburn (born 1962), former American football punter

See also
 

Surnames of English origin